Kuo Hsing-chun (Amis name: Tana; born 26 November 1993) is a Taiwanese Amis weightlifter, Olympic gold medalist, five time world champion, two time Universiade champion, Asian Games champion, and five time Asian champion, competing in the 58 kg division until 2018 and 59 kg starting in 2018 after the International Weightlifting Federation reorganized the categories. She has set 11 senior world records in her career.

Early life
Kuo Hsing-chun was born in Yilan in 1993. She never knew her biological father, and was raised primarily by her grandmother, as her mother was frequently working. Kuo's given name, Hsing-chun, alludes to the difficult circumstances of her birth, as it sounds similar to hsing tsun (倖存), which means to have survived by luck or accident in Mandarin. When Kuo was born, her umbilical cord wound itself around her neck. In addition, her mother was in labor for over ten hours. The family moved repeatedly, living with several different relatives. Kuo began lifting weights in junior high school, and played a number of sports, including basketball, track and field, and soccer. She chose to specialize in weightlifting in high school.

Career

Olympics

In 2012, she competed at the 2012 Summer Olympics in the women's 58 kg category and placed sixth overall.

At the 2016 Summer Olympics, she competed in the 58 kg category. In the snatch portion of the competition, she completed her first lift of 102 kg, but was unable to complete her last two lifts of 105 kg. Going into the clean and jerk portion of the competition, she was in third place, as she was 8 kg behind Sukanya Srisurat and tied in weight with Pimsiri Sirikaew (Pimsiri Sirikaew weighed .46 kg less). In the clean and jerk portion, she completed a 129 kg lift which secured her at least a bronze medal finish. For her final lift, she attempted an Olympic record lift of 139 kg, which would put her in first place, but was unable to lift it. She won a bronze medal with a total of 231 kg.

In 2021, she won a gold medal and broke three Olympic records in the women's 59kg weightlifting competition at the 2020 Summer Olympics in Tokyo.

World Championships
In 2013, she competed at the 2013 World Weightlifting Championships in the 58 kg category. After the snatch portion of the competition she was in second place behind Deng Wei, they both had lifted 108 kg, but Deng Wei was 0.46 kg lighter. In the clean and jerk portion of the competition, she lifted 133 kg in her first attempt, after Deng Wei was unable to complete any of her clean and jerks, she had the gold medal secured. Her total of 241 kg was a full 13 kg over the silver medalist Alexandra Escobar.

The 2015 World Weightlifting Championships was her first competition back from a disappointing year (due to injury), and she competed in the 58 kg category. After the snatch portion of the competition, she was in fourth place with 103 kg, the leader Boyanka Kostova set a world record in the snatch with 112 kg. In the clean and jerk portion, she lifted 133 kg with her final lift securing a bronze medal in the clean and jerk and in the total.

Coming into the 2017 World Weightlifting Championships, she was expected to put up a solid performance after her record-setting performance at the 2017 Summer Universiade. She competed in the 58 kg category, against the reigning Olympic Champion Sukanya Srisurat and it was expected to be a close competition. After the snatch portion, Sukanya Srisurat was in the gold medal position with 105 kg, Kuo also lifted the same, but Srisurat had lifted the weight first. In the clean and jerk portion, Sukanya Srisurat had completed all of her attempts before Kuo had attempted any of her lifts. She made her first lift of 126 kg, securing the gold medal. She added onto that total, lifting 135 kg in the clean and jerk, finishing with 240 kg, a full 15 kg more than reigning Olympic Champion, and silver medalist Srisurat.

In 2018, the International Weightlifting Federation reorganized the categories, and Kuo competed at the 2018 World Weightlifting Championships in the new 59 kg category. In the snatch portion, she lifted a new world record of 105 kg, and led going into the clean and jerk portion by 2 kg over the silver medalist Hoàng Thị Duyên and bronze medallist Rebeka Koha. During the clean and jerk portion, she successfully lifted 128 kg in her first attempt, setting a new world record in the total. With her last successful lift of 132 kg she set a new world record in the clean and jerk and total. Chen Guiming, the eventual silver medalist attempted a world record lift of 140 kg, which would have given her the lead, but she was unable to lift it. As a result, Kuo won the gold medal in the total. She set four senior world records in the competition and won her third World Championships.

Kuo competed in the 2019 World Weightlifting Championships, where she broke two of her own world records in the women's 59 kg category, with 140 kg in the clean and jerk, and 246 kg in the combined lift.

In 2021, she won the gold medal in the women's 59 kg event at the 2021 World Weightlifting Championships held in Tashkent, Uzbekistan. She won the silver medal in the women's 59kg event at the 2022 World Weightlifting Championships held in Bogotá, Colombia.

Asian Games
Before the 2014 Asian Games, she suffered an injury to her leg, which left her confined to a wheelchair for a month, as a result of the injury she donated an ambulance to Taitung hospital. Injury notwithstanding, she went on to place fourth at the 2014 Asian Games in the 58 kg category.

She was the flag bearer for Taiwan at the 2018 Asian Games where she competed in the 58 kg category. After the snatch portion of the competition she led Sukanya Srisurat by 2 kg with 105 kg. In the clean and jerk portion of the competition she secured the gold medal with her first lift of 125 kg, her next attempt was called at 133 kg, but there was an error loading the bar and only 130.5 kg was put on, she made the lift with a lopsided bar (one side weighed 2.5 kg more than the other) and received credit for 130 kg. Her last attempt in the clean and jerk was for a world record weight of 143 kg but she was unable to make the lift.

Universiade
Kuo won gold at the 2017 Summer Universiade and set a world record of 142 kg for the clean and jerk in her final lift. Following her performance at the Universiade, Kuo was awarded the Order of Brilliant Star, and chose to donate her winnings, totaling NT$1.9 million ($), back to her community.

Asian Weightlifting Championships
Kuo competed at the 2019 Asian Weightlifting Championships in the 59 kg category. After her second successful lift of 103 kg, she had secured a gold medal in the snatch, and attempted a world record lift of 106 kg which she successfully completed. In the clean and jerk portion, she had a gold medal in the total virtually guaranteed with her second lift of 134 kg, this gave her a new world record total of 240 kg. Her last attempt of 137 kg broke the clean and jerk world record, and the total world record she had just set. Chen Guiming attempted a 138 kg clean and jerk, but was unable to complete the lift which gave Chen a silver medal in the total, a full 10 kg behind gold medalist Kuo.

Major results

CWR: Current world record
WR: World record

See also
 Sport in Taiwan
 List of flag bearers for Chinese Taipei at the Olympics

References

External links

Taiwanese female weightlifters
Living people
Olympic weightlifters of Taiwan
Weightlifters at the 2012 Summer Olympics
Weightlifters at the 2016 Summer Olympics
Weightlifters at the 2010 Summer Youth Olympics
Weightlifters at the 2014 Asian Games
World Weightlifting Championships medalists
1993 births
Amis people
People from Yilan County, Taiwan
Olympic bronze medalists for Taiwan
Medalists at the 2016 Summer Olympics
Olympic medalists in weightlifting
Universiade medalists in weightlifting
Recipients of the Order of Brilliant Star
Medalists at the 2018 Asian Games
Asian Games medalists in weightlifting
Asian Games gold medalists for Chinese Taipei
Weightlifters at the 2018 Asian Games
Universiade gold medalists for Chinese Taipei
Fu Jen Catholic University alumni
Competitors at the 2017 Summer Universiade
Medalists at the 2013 Summer Universiade
Weightlifters at the 2020 Summer Olympics
Medalists at the 2020 Summer Olympics
Olympic gold medalists for Taiwan
21st-century Taiwanese women